Nespelem may also refer to:

 Nespelem, Washington, a city in eastern Washington state.
 Nespelem River, a tributary of the Columbia River.
 Nespelem (tribe), a Native American tribe
 Nespelem (art), an art movement and colony located in the Nespelem, Washington area
 Nespelem, a stern-wheel steamboat later named the Robert Young.